Educational organization may refer to:

 Educational institution
 School 
 University
 Educational management